The 53rd National Film Awards, presented by Directorate of Film Festivals, the organisation set up by Ministry of Information and Broadcasting, India to felicitate the best of Indian Cinema released in the year 2005.

The selection process of 53rd National Film Awards began with the constitution of three Juries for feature film, non-feature film and best writing on cinema sections, which were declared on 28 July 2006. B. Saroja Devi, an yesteryear's actress, headed the feature film Jury, which had eleven other members. A documentary maker and Indian television personality Siddharth Kak headed the six-member non-feature film Jury. The Jury for best writing on cinema was headed by veteran film critic Khalid Mohamed.

The final announcement of awards was much delayed due to various controversies associated with them. Actual announcement was done almost after the 14th months of its expected announcement, after Delhi High Court gave green signal to announce the awards in all categories. Awards were scheduled to be declared on 12 May 2006.

Awards were announced by each committee chairpersons on 7 August 2007 and ceremony took place at Vigyan Bhavan, New Delhi on 14 September 2007 and awards were given President of India, Pratibha Patil. It was also announced that prize money would be increased by five times and more categories would be added from next year.

Awards 

Awards were divided into feature films, non-feature films and books written on Indian cinema.

Lifetime Achievement Award

Feature films 

Feature films were awarded at All India as well as regional level. For 53rd National Film Awards, a Bengali film, Kaalpurush won the National Film Award for Best Feature Film; whereas a Hindi film, Rang De Basanti, won the maximum number of awards (4). Following were the awards given in each category:

Juries 

A committee headed by B. Saroja Devi was appointed to evaluate the feature films awards. Following were the jury members:

 Jury Members
 B. Saroja Devi (Chairperson)P. H. VishwanathKatte RamachandraB. S. LoknathSeema BiswasP. Sudershan
 ShyamaprasadShyamali Deb BanerjeeMeena DebbarmaAnwar AliIna PuriAshok Saran

All India Award 

Following were the awards given:

Golden Lotus Award 

Official Name: Swarna Kamal

All the awardees are awarded with 'Golden Lotus Award (Swarna Kamal)', a certificate and cash prize.

Silver Lotus Award 

Official Name: Rajat Kamal

All the awardees are awarded with 'Silver Lotus Award (Rajat Kamal)', a certificate and cash prize.

Regional Awards 

The award is given to best film in the regional languages in India.

Best Feature Film in Each of the Language Other Than Those Specified In the Schedule VIII of the Constitution

Non-Feature Films 

Films made in any Indian language shot on 16 mm, 35 mm or in a wider gauge or digital format and released on either film format or video/digital but certified by the Central Board of Film Certification as a documentary/newsreel/fiction are eligible for non-feature film section.

Juries 

A committee headed by Siddharth Kak was appointed to evaluate the non-feature films awards. Following were the jury members:

 Jury Members
 Siddharth Kak (Chairperson)Chinmoya NathSangeeta TamuliKishore DangKireet KhuranaA. B. Tripathi

Golden Lotus Award 

Official Name: Swarna Kamal

All the awardees are awarded with 'Golden Lotus Award (Swarna Kamal)', a certificate and cash prize.

Silver Lotus Award 

Official Name: Rajat Kamal

All the awardees are awarded with 'Silver Lotus Award (Rajat Kamal)' and cash prize.

Best Writing on Cinema 

The awards aim at encouraging study and appreciation of cinema as an art form and dissemination of information and critical appreciation of this art-form through publication of books, articles, reviews etc.

Juries 

A committee headed by Khalid Mohamed was appointed to evaluate the writing on Indian cinema. Following were the jury members:

 Jury Members
 Khalid Mohamed (Chairperson)Ratnottama SenguptaAmitabh Parashar

Golden Lotus Award 
Official Name: Swarna Kamal

All the awardees are awarded with 'Golden Lotus Award (Swarna Kamal)' and cash prize.

Awards not given 

Following were the awards not given as no film was found to be suitable for the award:

 Best Film on Family Welfare
 Best Non-Feature Film on Family Welfare
 Best Non-Feature Film Music Direction
 Best Educational / Motivational / Instructional Film
 Best Feature Film in Manipuri
 Best Promotional Film
 Best Exploration / Adventure Film

Controversies 

The awards were surrounded by couple of controversies related to it. This delayed the final announcement of the awards. The year was considered as a 'zero year' for the Film Awards.

Bombay and Delhi High Court Judgements 

As per the rule, award committee judges the films which have obtained the censorship certificate from Central Board of Film Certification in order to be eligible for entry. Noted film-makers Anand Patwardhan, Gaurav Jani and Simantini Dhuru had filed a petition in the Bombay High Court asking for exemptions for their films from obtaining censor board certification. Based on this petition, the court had given judgments to consider the uncensored films as well for the awards. In spite of this judgment, juries went ahead with the existing rule and left out uncensored non-feature films.

On this judgment, Ministry of Information and Broadcasting decided to appeal in the Supreme Court of India against this verdict.

Justice B.D. Ahmed of Supreme Court then given a verdict putting aside the earlier verdict given by Bombay High Court and made compulsory for the films to have the censor board certificate.

Favoritism for the films 

Kolkata based film critic and one of the jurors for 53rd National Film Awards, Shyamali Deb Banerjee, had filed a petition in the Delhi High Court against the favouritism in the selection of films for the awards in the five categories and levelling charges of corruption and fixing in deciding the 53rd Awards. She alleged that there is pressure on the members of the jury by the Directorate of the Film Festivals to decide in favour of particular films. According to her, awards have been 'High Jacked' and nexus between producers, distributors and directors.

To support her claim, she sent two letters to Directorate of the Film Festivals on 13 August and 4 September 2006, in which she questioned the selection process of the awards and also alleged that preliminary round drop-out films were then selected for the awards.

She had challenged the decision to give the awards to Black for Best Film in Hindi and Best Actor, Parineeta for Best Debut Director, saying it is not an original work and is inspired with the movies released earlier on the same theme. Parzania winning the Best Director for Rahul Dholakia and Sarika for  Best Actress was accused to mock the Indian democratic system. However, Hindi Film Apaharan and Tamil film Anniyan which won Best Screenplay and Best Special Effects respectively were accused of not even qualifying the preliminary rounds and then winning the awards.

However, the petition was dismissed by the court saying the petitioner had no case when the other members of the Jury had no objection to the selection of the films for the awards.

Awards for Black 

Sanjay Leela Bhansali's Black also faced the heat of controversy when Shyamali Deb Banerjee, a juror for the 53rd National Film Awards, claimed that the film was ineligible for awards as it was an adaptation of the film The Miracle Worker and according to the rules adaptations were ineligible for awards. She had also filed a petition in the court. Though the film finally won three national awards, for Best Actor, Best Costume Design and Best Feature Film in Hindi.

Awards for Parzania 

Shyamali Deb Banerjee had also alleged Rahul Dholakia's Parzania in her filed petition. It said that "film mocks the Indian democratic system and ends with just forming a human rights commission for a probe into the riots. This film has been banned in Gujarat and if the award for best director goes to this film, it might fan further controversy." Film won Rahul Dholakia, his first National Film Award for Best Direction and Sarika won Best Actress Award.

References

External links 
 National Film Awards Archives
 Official Page for Directorate of Film Festivals, India

National Film Awards (India) ceremonies
2007 Indian film awards